QAS may stand for:

Queensland Ambulance Service
Queensland Academy of Sport
Quick arbitration and selection, as used in Parallel SCSI interfaces
Queen Alexandra's Royal Army Nursing Corps (QAs)
Quaternary ammonium salt

See also

 
 
 
 QA (disambiguation)
 Qass, Azerbaijan
 Qāṣṣ